The Jim Yoshii Pile-Up is a 5 piece band formed in 1997 in Oakland, California. Named after a high school friend of the band, their highly textured sound spans the range from indie to post-rock. They have released three full lengths on Absolutely Kosher Records. The Jim Yoshii Pile-Up has recorded with Christopher Walla of Deathcab for Cutie and Xiu Xiu. As of 2006, the band is on hiatus. Paul Gonzenbach is currently releasing albums under his own name. Noah Blumberg is in the duo Meanest Man Contest.

Members
Paul Gonzenbach - guitar, vocals, piano
Ryan Craven - drums
Frankie Koeller - bass
Sikwaya Condon - guitar (1997-2001)
Noah Blumberg - guitar (2001–Present)
Ian Connelly - guitar (2000–Present)

Discography

Albums
 It's Winter Here (March, 2001)
 Homemade Drugs (October, 2002)
 Picks Us Apart (July, 2005)

EPs
 Self-Titled CD-EP (1999)
 It's Winter Somewhere (2001)
 Burning Flag (Self-Released Tour EP, (2002)

Splits
Split 7" with Wussom Pow (September, 2002)
Split CD with Xiu Xiu (July, 2003)
Split 7" with Meanest Man Contest (2003)

Compilation appearances
Cool Beans issue # comp (Cool Beans, 2000)
Tired of Standing Still (Highpoint Lowlife, 2001)

References

External links 
Official Site
 Pitchfork Media Reviews: debut EP, Homemade Drugs, Insound Xiu Xiu split, Picks Us Apart
 [ AllMusic]
Absolutely Kosher Records
 Paul Gonzenbach homepage

Jim Yoshii Pile-Up